Elections to South Lanarkshire Council were held on 6 May 1999, the same day as the other Scottish local government elections and the inaugural Scottish Parliament election. Following a review, the number of single-member wards reduced from 73 to 67.

The council remained under Scottish Labour Party control following the election - they won seven fewer seats and collected 7% less of the overall vote share than in 1995, but with less seats available their percentage loss was only 3%, and the number of votes they collected increased substantially due to the higher voter turnout, which went up from 107,833 (46.4% turnout) in 1995 to 139,564 (59.2% turnout), an increase of 29%; this was at least partly attributable to the interest in the new Scottish Parliament - the 1995 election had not been held in conjunction with votes for any other body.

The SNP and Conservative vote numbers also each nearly doubled, but with far less dramatic gains in terms of their vote share and seats. In those circumstances, the Liberal Democrats polling almost the same numbers as four years earlier could be seen as the most disappointing outcome for a major party in South Lanarkshire, in contrast to their positive overall results across Scotland on the night.

Aggregate results

Ward results

Rutherglen and Cambuslang

Notes

References

1999 Scottish local elections
1999